Anthony Ebuka Victor (born 5 January 2001), known professionally as Victony is a Nigerian singer, rapper and songwriter. He is from the Orsu local government area of Imo State. He was influenced while growing up by artists like Davido, Wizkid, Mi, and Falz. He is signed to a Nigerian record label called Mainland BlockParty and Jungle Records. He released a debut studio album Saturn, in August 2020. He released his first single titled Ina Benz, which was his first appearance in the music industry.

Early life and career 

Victony first came unto the scene when he traded rap verses with Ladipoe on his revival Sunday series. He made his debut with a mixtape on SoundCloud titled The Outlaw King, the reason he is still known as "The Outlaw King".

The mixtape was followed by covers of international hit records like "Bodak Yellow" by Cardi B, "Moonlight" by XXXTentacion, and "On the Low" by Burna Boy. Victony started off as a rapper but later switched and started releasing R&B, trap music, and Afropop records. 2021 started with his record "Pray" gaining traction, a song that was released after he was in a car crash. He got his biggest break in October 2021 when he teamed up with Mayorkun on the song "Holy Father". The song was number one on Apple Music Nigeria and peaked at number 3 on the Billboard Top Triller Global charts in December 2021. He later collaborated with Grammy Award-winning producer Rexxie on an EP called Nataraja.

Personal life 

He is currently a student of the Federal university of Technology Owerri (F.U.T.O). On 21 April 2021, Victony was involved in a fatal car crash. The crash claimed the life of one of his friends, Doyin, and he needed surgery.

Victony has remained in a wheelchair after the surgery, but stood to perform for the first time alongside Davido and Mayorkun on 24 December 2021.

Discography

Extended Plays

Singles

As featured artist

References 

Rappers from Lagos
Contemporary R&B singers
Nigerian rhythm and blues singer-songwriters
2001 births
Living people